Askarbek Salymbekov is a Kyrgyz politician. He was a former mayor of the capital Bishkek and withdrew his candidacy for another term in 2005. He was replaced on August 18, 2005 by Arstanbek Nogoev who was voted to become the capital's new mayor by a vote of 37 for and 3 against.

References

People from Bishkek
Mayors of Bishkek
Living people
Year of birth missing (living people)
Place of birth missing (living people)